The Unbound Prometheus: Technological Change and Industrial Development in Western Europe from 1750 to the Present is an economic history book by David S. Landes. Its focus is on the Industrial Revolution in England and its spread to the rest of Western Europe. Its principal contribution is the argument in favor of the Second Industrial Revolution.
 
The book was first published in 1969 by Cambridge University Press. It first appeared in the Cambridge Economic History of Europe, Volume VI in 1965, but it was expanded for the 1969 edition. The book deals with innovations and inventions that brought about modernization and technological developments in Western Europe beginning in the 18th century.

The book explores why Europe was the first to industrialize and argues that industrialization is just one part of a larger process of modernization during which a culture significantly changes its social order, institutional order, attitudes, values, and government in order to promote and accommodate further change.

In addition, the book also discusses the economic boom that has occurred since the industrial revolution began and argues that only through continued industrialization can the world sustain itself economically in the coming years. The book is considered by many to be one of the most significant books on the economic history of industrialization in Western Europe . It is considered to be one of the preeminent works on the economic history of industrialization in Western Europe.  It has been reprinted numerous times and was published in a second edition with new commentary by Landes in 2003.

1969 books
Books about the Industrial Revolution